Camden South is a suburb of the Macarthur Region of Sydney in the state of New South Wales, Australia in Camden Council. It is to the immediate south of Camden, New South Wales and shares the same postcode 2570.

History
The area now known as Camden South was originally home to the Muringong, the southernmost of the Darug people, and the Gandangara people of the Southern Highlands. In 1805, wool pioneer John Macarthur was granted 5,000 acres (20 km2) at Cowpastures (now Camden). After the land was cleared, it was used for farming for most of the next 200 years until Sydney's suburban sprawl reached the town of Camden and modern suburbs like Camden South were subdivided into housing blocks.

Heritage listings 
Camden South has a number of heritage-listed sites, including:
 Elizabeth Macarthur Avenue: Camden Park Estate and Belgenny Farm

People

Demographics
According to the 2016 census of Population, there were 4,539 people in Camden South.
 Aboriginal and Torres Strait Islander people made up 2.3% of the population. 
 85.3% of people were born in Australia. The next most common country of birth was England at 5.1%.   
 94.2% of people only spoke English at home. 
 The most common responses for religion were Catholic 29.6%, Anglican 28.2% and No Religion 21.8%.

Politics 
Camden South lies in the south ward of Camden Council, currently represented by Chris Patterson (who is also the Mayor of Camden), Eva Campbell and Fred Whiteman. It sits within the state electorate of Camden, represented by Labor's Geoff Corrigan, the former Mayor of Camden, and the federal electorate of Macarthur, represented by Liberal's Pat Farmer, the former ultra-marathon runner.

References

 
Towns in the Macarthur (New South Wales)
Suburbs of Sydney